Evgeny Konstantinovich Sklyanin (born May 24, 1955 in Leningrad, Soviet Union) is a mathematical physicist, currently a professor of mathematics at the University of York. His research is in the fields of integrable systems and quantum groups. His major contributions are in the theory of quantum integrable systems, separation of variables, special functions.

Biography

He graduated from the Department of Physics, Leningrad State University (USSR) in 1978 and earned PhD (Candidate) in 1980 and DrSci (Habilitation) degree in 1989, both at Steklov Mathematical Institute, St. Petersburg. He then held various research positions at Steklov until 2001, when he moved to the University of York.

He provided, via particular examples, ideas that led to the discovery of quantum groups and Yangians.
He pioneered the investigation of quantum integrable systems with boundaries.
He developed the method of separation of variables in the theory of integrable systems.

He was elected Fellow of the Royal Society in 2008.

List of publications
Scientific publications of E. K. Sklyanin on Google Scholar

References

External links

Evgeny Sklyanin at The Royal Society

Academics of the University of York
Mathematicians from Saint Petersburg
1955 births
Living people
20th-century Russian mathematicians
21st-century Russian mathematicians
Fellows of the Royal Society
Russian physicists